M. R. Krishnamurthy (1940–2012) who popularly referred to as MRK, was an actor and stage artist who appeared in Tamil films. He starred in more than 100 films and in more than 500 stage plays conceived and hosted by various leading stage artistes.

Film career
MRK’s significant films are Veetula Raman Veliyila Krishnan, Pondatti Thevai and Ulle Veliye and the Rajini-starrers Dharmathin Thalaivan and Arunachalam. He has also worked with Kamal Haasan in the film Maharasan and with Vikram in Dhill.

MRK worked as an assistant director under the late and legendary director C. V. Sridhar in a solitary film Oru Odai Nadhiyagiradhu which had the late Raghuvaran playing the lead role. He had also played significant roles in drama troupes run by the likes of V. Gopalakrishnan and Senthamarai, both of whom were popular actors in films as well as on stage.

Partial filmography

Death
MRK died on 2 August 2012. He had been affected by paralysis and was bed-ridden for the past few months. His wife died in 2008 and MRK was survived by a son and a daughter.

References

Male actors in Tamil cinema
Indian male film actors
1940 births
2012 deaths
Date of birth missing
Place of birth missing